John Joseph Cavanaugh (June 5, 1900 – January 14, 1961) was a Major League Baseball third baseman. He played in one game for the Philadelphia Phillies on July 7 during the 1919 Philadelphia Phillies season. He was the first player born in the 1900s to appear in a Major League Baseball game.

References

External links

1900 births
1961 deaths
Major League Baseball third basemen
Philadelphia Phillies players
Baseball players from Pennsylvania